was a Japanese swimmer. He competed in the men's 400 metre freestyle at the 1936 Summer Olympics.

References

External links
 

1912 births
1980 deaths
Olympic swimmers of Japan
Swimmers at the 1936 Summer Olympics
Sportspeople from Hokkaido
People from Yoichi, Hokkaido
Japanese male freestyle swimmers
20th-century Japanese people